Rahima Banu Begum (born 16 October 1972) is the last known person to have been infected with naturally occurring Variola major smallpox, the more deadly variety of the disease.

Biography

The disease 
The case was reported on 16 October 1975, when Banu was three years old, and living in the village of Kuralia on Bhola Island in the Bangladeshi district of Barisal. Her case was reported by an eight-year-old girl, Bilkisunnessa, who was paid 250 taka. Information on the case was forwarded via telegram to D.A. Henderson, who led the World Health Organization's (WHO) campaign to eradicate the disease. The WHO team arrived and cared for Banu, who made a full recovery. On 24 November 1975 she was declared free of the virus. Scabs of the virus from her body were transferred to the US Centers for Disease Control and Prevention (CDC) office in Atlanta, where they are currently stored along with hundreds of other samples. Everyone on the island who might have come into contact with the infected were vaccinated, while the island was searched to find others who might still be infected. The strain from her sample is known as Bangladesh 1975 formally and the Rahima strain informally.

Later life 
Banu created income for her family by posing for photos. In an interview in 2009, Banu said she had four children after marrying a farmer at the age of 18. She said that villagers and her in-laws treated her poorly because she had suffered from smallpox. Banu is a housewife and her husband, Rafiqul Islam, is a day laborer and rickshaw puller. The World Health Organization bought her a piece of land but most of that was swallowed by the river. The area she lives in also saw an increased salination of the water and soil making farming difficult.

See also 
 Ali Maow Maalin, last person infected with naturally occurring Variola minor.
 Janet Parker, last known person to die from smallpox

References

External links
 The village of Kuralia

Living people
1972 births
Smallpox eradication
Bangladeshi women
People from Bhola District